Tocantinsia piresi is a species of driftwood catfish (order Siluriformes), and is the only species of the genus Tocantinsia. T. piresi grows to a length of about 10 centimetres (3.9 in) SL and originates from the upper Tocantins River basin. During the rainy season, T. piresi is an omnivore that feeds mainly on allochthonous food items such as fruits, seeds, flowers, and animals from the igapo, permanently flooded land where roots of vegetation are always submerged. Reproduction occurs between November and January, when the water level of the river is rising.

References

Auchenipteridae
Fish of the Tocantins River basin
Fish described in 1920
Taxa named by Alípio de Miranda-Ribeiro